Marcos Romeu Moreira da Rocha (born 17 February 1986), known as Romeu, is a Portuguese former professional footballer who played as a defensive midfielder.

Club career
Born in Paredes, Porto District, Romeu spent the better part of his first six years as a senior competing in the third and fourth divisions of Portuguese football, with hometown club U.S.C. Paredes. He was part of F.C. Penafiel's Primeira Liga roster in the 2005−06 season, but his input consisted of two bench appearances.

In the summer of 2013, after two years in the Segunda Liga with C.D. Aves, Romeu signed for F.C. Paços de Ferreira of the top flight. He made his debut in the competition on 16 August, playing 17 minutes in a 0−2 home loss against S.C. Braga.

Romeu scored his first goal in the Portuguese top tier on 12 December 2015, netting the opener in a 6−0 home win over C.F. União. He suffered a serious muscular injury the following February, going on to miss the entire 2016−17 campaign but having his contract previously renewed.

On 21 June 2017, free agent Romeu joined division two side Varzim S.C. on a one-year deal. The following January, after less than half an hour of game time, he cancelled his contract and dropped down a tier to Amarante FC.

Personal life
Romeu's younger brother, Vasco, was also a footballer and a midfielder. He shared teams with his sibling on several occasions.

References

External links

1986 births
Living people
People from Paredes, Portugal
Sportspeople from Porto District
Portuguese footballers
Association football midfielders
Primeira Liga players
Liga Portugal 2 players
Segunda Divisão players
F.C. Penafiel players
U.S.C. Paredes players
C.D. Aves players
F.C. Paços de Ferreira players
Varzim S.C. players
Amarante F.C. players
AC Vila Meã players